Exoncotis is a genus of moths in the family Acrolophidae.

Species
Exoncotis gemistis 
Exoncotis increpans 
Exoncotis resona 
Exoncotis umbraticella

References

Acrolophidae
Taxa named by Edward Meyrick
Moth genera